The Gahendra Rifle is a .577/450 Martini–Henry breech loading military rifle manufactured by gunsmiths of the Nepal Army under the direction of General Gehendra Shamsher JBR in the early 1880s. The design is a modified version of the 1869 Westley Richards patented design.

References

Early rifles